Kristijan Đurasek (born 26 July 1987) is a Croatian professional road bicycle racer, who is currently suspended from the sport. He has been competing since 2005, and has represented Croatia at two Summer Olympic Games, in 2012 and 2016.

In November 2019 he was banned for four years due to the Operation Aderlass investigation into blood doping.

Professional career

Perutnina Ptuj (2006–2008)
Đurasek started racing for Slovenian continental team  in 2006, but his professional career only started in 2008. At the time he did not have much success in international races.

Loborika (2009–2011)
Đurasek signed a contract with Croatian continental team  at the beginning of 2009. In 2011, he won his first UCI Europe Tour race at the GP Folignano. Two days later he repeated his success by winning the Trofeo Internazionale Bastianelli. During those years he won three more medals at the Croatian road cycling championships including both national titles at the 2011 championships.

Adria Mobil (2012)
In 2012, Đurasek competed for continental team . His most notable results were third place in the GP Industria & Artigianato di Larciano, seventh place in the Giro dell'Appennino and third place in the Passo della Bocchetta stage in the Giro di Padania. He competed at the 2012 Summer Olympics as a late replacement for Robert Kišerlovski, who was injured on the 14th stage of the Tour de France. He finished 68th in the road race, 40 seconds behind the race winner Alexander Vinokourov.

Lampre–Mérida (2013–2019)
As a result, he became the third Croatian cyclist ever to ride for a UCI ProTeam. His first UCI World Tour race was Paris–Nice, where he finished 80th overall. His first victory was in the Tre Valli Varesine on 23 August 2013. At the end of the 2013 season Đurasek competed at the World Championships in men's road race, but he failed to complete the race. He finished 7th overall at the 2014 Tour of Turkey, 45 seconds behind the race winner Adam Yates.

In 2015, Đurasek awarded himself the leader's jersey of the Tour of Turkey on the sixth stage featuring a hilltop finish, taking the lead from Davide Rebellin. He went on to win the race in the general classification, scoring a historic result for Croatian cycling. In the Tour de Suisse, he won the second stage by attacking a leading group of eight other riders, putting four seconds into them. He was named in the start list for the 2015 Vuelta a España.

In 2016, Đurasek competed at his second Summer Olympics. At the Games held in Rio de Janeiro, Brazil, Đurasek finished 18th, more than 3 minutes behind the race winner Greg Van Avermaet. As of 2016, 18th place is the best ever Croatian Olympic result across all cycling events. During that year he also took part at the Tour de France and Vuelta a España.

At the start of the 2017 season, Đurasek logged a stage win at the Tour of Croatia, where he outsprinted Vincenzo Nibali at the Biokovo mountain finish.

Major results

2007
 2nd Time trial, National Road Championships
2008
 National Road Championships
1st  Under-23 time trial
3rd Road race
 4th Overall Tour de Serbie
2009
 2nd Tour of Vojvodina II
 6th GP Capodarco
 7th Trofeo Internazionale Bastianelli
 10th Overall Tour de Serbie
2010
 2nd Trofeo Internazionale Bastianelli
 2nd Tour of Vojvodina II
 3rd Overall Oberösterreich Rundfahrt
 5th Overall Giro del Friuli-Venezia Giulia
 8th Trofeo Gianfranco Bianchin
 10th Banja Luka–Belgrade I
2011
 National Road Championships
1st  Road race
1st  Time trial
 1st GP Folignano
 1st Trofeo Internazionale Bastianelli
 3rd Overall Okolo Slovenska
 4th Memoriał Henryka Łasaka
2012
 National Road Championships
2nd Road race
2nd Time trial
 3rd GP Industria & Artigianato di Larciano
 4th Overall Istrian Spring Trophy
 7th Giro dell'Appennino
 8th Banja Luka–Belgrade II
 9th Overall Giro di Padania
2013
 1st Tre Valli Varesine
2014
 7th Overall Tour of Turkey
 7th Tre Valli Varesine
2015
 1st  Overall Tour of Turkey
 1st Stage 2 Tour de Suisse

2017
1st Stage 2 Tour of Croatia
2018
9th Overall Tour of California

Grand Tour general classification results timeline

References

External links

Croatian male cyclists
1987 births
Living people
Sportspeople from Varaždin
Cyclists at the 2012 Summer Olympics
Cyclists at the 2016 Summer Olympics
Olympic cyclists of Croatia
Tour de Suisse stage winners
Presidential Cycling Tour of Turkey winners